Christopher Donald Michael Tooley (born 19 April 1964) is an English former cricketer.  Tooley was a right-handed batsman who bowled right-arm medium pace.  He was born at Bromley, Kent.

Tooley made his first-class debut for Oxford University against Somerset in 1985.  From 1985 to 1987, he represented the university in 25 first-class matches, the last of which came in the 1987 University Match against Cambridge University; he won Blues for cricket in each of his three years in the team.  In his 25 first-class matches, he scored 667 runs at a batting average of 19.61, with 3 half centuries and a high score of 66.  In the field he took 9 catches.  With the ball he took 2 wickets at a bowling average of 18.50, with best figures of 1/16.

In 1986, it was for a Combined Universities team that he made his debut in List A cricket against Hampshire in the Benson and Hedges Cup.  He represented the team in a further 6 List A matches from 1986 to 1987, the last of which came against Middlesex.  In his 7 List A matches for the team, he scored 106 runs at an average of 17.66, with a single half century high score of 62, while in the field he took a single catch.

Tooley later represented the Kent Cricket Board in a single List A match against the Worcestershire Cricket Board in the 1999 NatWest Trophy.

References

External links

1964 births
Living people
People from Bromley
English cricketers
Oxford University cricketers
Kent Cricket Board cricketers
Alumni of Magdalen College, Oxford
Oxford and Cambridge Universities cricketers
British Universities cricketers